South Carolina Highway 8 (SC 8) is a  primary state highway in the U.S. state of South Carolina. It travels from U.S. Route 276 (US 276) in northern Greenville County to US 25 and SC 418 in Ware Place. It travels physically north and south though it is signed as a west-east highway with its western terminus at US 276 and its eastern terminus at US 25/SC 418.

Route description

SC 8 begins in Ware Place at the junction of US 25 and SC 418. From here, it travels west for about  when it crosses the Saluda River and enters the town of Pelzer in Anderson County. It meets SC 20 at the town limit of Pelzer and after crossing SC 20 it enters West Pelzer.

About  past US 29, the highway has an interchange with Interstate 85 (I-85) at its exit 32. Another mile past this interchange, SC 8 intersects SC 81, which runs concurrent with SC 8 for two miles (3 km). SC 8 turns to the west and crosses SC 88 and winds its way to the western terminus of SC 86.

Here, it turns to the northwest and crosses into Pickens County and runs toward Easley. SC 8 then turns to the northwest and crosses US 123, but has no access to the highway directly. After one mile (1.6 km), it intersects SC 93 just west of downtown Easley. From here, it is eight miles (13 km) to Pickens, and for this duration, the road is four-laned. In downtown Pickens, SC 8 meets SC 183 and overlaps it for a half-mile.

SC 8 continues straight and runs toward Pumpkintown, along the way meeting the western terminus of SC 186 and the northern terminus of SC 135. In Pumpkintown, it crosses SC 288 and soon meets SC 11, which it has a concurrency with for about a half-mile. SC 8 then turns north and meets its end at US 276 in northern Greenville County.

History
The first alignment of SC 8 ran from the Georgia state line through Anderson, Greenville, Greer, Spartanburg, Gaffney, and Blacksburg into North Carolina near Grover. This alignment connected directly to Georgia State Route 8 at the Georgia state line. In 1927, this became US 29, and SC 8 was put onto a completely different alignment, which was previously SC 13 (which was reused on former SC 17).  With a few minor changes, this is today's SC 8.

Major intersections

Easley connector route

South Carolina Highway 8 Connector (SC 8 Conn.) is a connector route in the west-central part of Easley that connects SC 8 (South 5th Street) with SC 93 (East Main Street). The connector route is not signed along SC 8 or SC 93, but there is signage along its actual path. The entire length is known as Folger Avenue.

SC 8 Conn. and Folger Avenue begin at an intersection with the SC 8 mainline (South 5th Street) and travel to the northeast. They curve to the east-northeast and reach their eastern terminus, an intersection with SC 93 (East Main Street).

See also

References

External links

SC 8 at Virginia Highways' South Carolina Highways Annex

008
South Carolina Highway 8
South Carolina Highway 8
South Carolina Highway 8